Division No. 15 is a census division in Alberta, Canada. The majority of the division is located in Alberta's Rockies, while the southernmost portion of the division is located within southern Alberta. The division's largest urban community is the Town of Canmore.

Census subdivisions 
The following census subdivisions (municipalities or municipal equivalents) are located within Alberta's Division No. 15.

Towns
Banff
Canmore
Summer villages
Ghost Lake
Waiparous
Specialized municipalities
Crowsnest Pass
Jasper
Municipal districts
Bighorn No. 8, M.D. of
Ranchland No. 66, M.D. of
Improvement districts
Improvement District No. 9 (Banff National Park)
Improvement District No. 12 (Jasper National Park)
Kananaskis Improvement District
Indian reserves
Stoney 142, 143, 144

Demographics 

See also 
List of census divisions of Alberta
List of communities in Alberta

References 

Census divisions of Alberta